The following is a list of episodes from the series Victor and Valentino.

Series overview

Episodes

Pilot (2016)

Season 1 (2019)

Season 2 (2020–21)

Season 3 (2021–22)

Notes

References

Lists of American children's animated television series episodes
Lists of Cartoon Network television series episodes